Barack, also spelled Barak or Baraq, is a given name of Arabic origin. From the Semitic root B-R-K, it means "blessed" and is most commonly used in its feminine form Baraka(h).

The Semitic root B-R-K has the original meaning of "to kneel down", with a secondary meaning "to bless".

In Islamic mysticism,  Barakah  is a concept  of spiritual presence or revelation.
The cognate Hebrew term is Berakhah (בְּרָכָה) "benediction, blessing" which is related to the Biblical Hebrew given name Baruch. It can also be derived from the root B-R-Q, meaning "lightning".

The name is cognate with the Amharic given name ብሩክ ("Biruk").

People with the given name

 Barack Adama (born 1985), a French rapper
 Barack Obama (b. 1961), former US president
 Barack Obama Sr. (1936-1982), father of Barack Obama and Kenyan economist

People with the surname
 Ehud Barak (born 1942), former Israeli prime minister 
 Ghiyas-ud-din Baraq (1266–1271), a Khan of the Chagatai Khanate
 Moises Barack (born 1943), a Peruvian footballer
 Tom Barrack (born 1947),  American private equity real estate investor and chairman of Donald Trumps Inaugural Committee

Fictional characters
The protagonist of Barack the Barbarian, a comic book series

See also
 Arabic name
 
 Barak (given name)
 Barak (surname)
 Burak (name)
 Burack
 
 Mubarak (name)

References 

Arabic masculine given names